John Haring (September 28, 1739 – April 1, 1809) was an American lawyer from New York City. He was a delegate for New York to the Continental Congress.

John was born to a large Dutch family at Tappan, New York which was then part of Orange County. He was the fourth of eight children. His parents were Colonel Abraham and Martyntje (Bogart) Haring, and he was christened "Jan" at the Dutch Reformed Church of Tappan. He remained a member of that church throughout his life. Haring attended school and read law in New York City and was admitted to the bar. He practiced both in the city and in Orange County. He married a cousin, Maria Haring on October 3, 1773. The couple would have eight children: Maria, Samuel, Elbert, Martyntje, Elisabeth, Margaret, John, and Nicholas.

John took his place in a family that was locally prominent. He served as a county judge. As the revolution neared he became a member, and then head of Orange County's Committee of Correspondence. In 1774, the county established their own form of self-government, by adopting the Orangetown Resolutions, which had been drafted by John and his brother Peter. One point in these resolutions was a non-importation agreement which embargoed British goods. When they sent Haring to the Continental Congress in Philadelphia, it adopted a very similar agreement on October 20, 1774.

Haring was elected to the New York Provincial Congress (or revolutionary government) five times from 1775 to 1777. In two of those sessions he was the president pro tem of that body. He served in the state Senate from 1781 to 1789, and was returned to national Continental Congress from 1785 to 1787.

In 1784 the New York state legislature was busy revising vestiges of the various laws and institutions from their colonial form to one befitting a free state. In 1755 a charter from the crown had established King’s College in New York City. This year it got a new charter, incorporating it as Columbia College. The charter established a board of regents, and named twenty-four original men, including John Haring. He remained in that post until his resignation in 1787.

In 1788 Haring was a delegate to the New York convention that ratified the U.S. Constitution. His vote, however, was against ratification, since he believed a stronger recognition of state and individual rights was required.

In 1794, he removed to Bergen County, New Jersey, and was a member of the New Jersey Legislature in 1795–96. About 1804, he returned to Tappan, NY, and was a presidential elector in 1804, voting for Thomas Jefferson and George Clinton. He was again a member of the New York State Assembly in 1806. He died at Blauvelt, New York on April 1, 1809, and is buried in the Dutch Reformed Church cemetery at Tappan. His wife Maria survived him, and lived until 1825.

External links

1739 births
1809 deaths
Members of the New York Provincial Congress
Continental Congressmen from New York (state)
18th-century American politicians
New York (state) state senators
Members of the New York State Assembly
1804 United States presidential electors
Columbia College (New York) alumni
People from Tappan, New York
People from Blauvelt, New York
American lawyers admitted to the practice of law by reading law